The following are the records of Lebanon in Olympic weightlifting. Records are maintained in each weight class for the snatch lift, clean and jerk lift, and the total for both lifts by the Lebanese Association of Weightlifting.

Men

Women

References

External links

records
Lebanon
Olympic weightlifting
weightlifting